Praemastus minerva is a moth in the subfamily Arctiinae. It was described by Paul Dognin in 1891. It is found in Colombia, Ecuador, Bolivia and Peru.

Subspecies
Praemastus minerva minerva
Praemastus minerva watkinsi (Rothschild, 1916) (Peru)

References

Natural History Museum Lepidoptera generic names catalog

Moths described in 1891
Arctiinae
Arctiinae of South America